Beith is a Scottish surname. Notable people with the name include:
Sir Alan Beith (born 1943), British politician
Alexander Beith (1799–1891), Scottish divine and author
Gilbert Beith (1827–1904), Scottish merchant and politician
Jackie Beith (1893–1961), Australian rugby union player
Sir John Beith (1914–2000), British diplomat
Major-General John Hay Beith (1876–1952), British schoolmaster, soldier and writer using the name Ian Hay
Robert Beith (1843–1922), Canadian politician